The International Parental Kidnapping Crime Act 1993 (IPKCA) is a United States federal law. H.R. 3378, approved December 2, was assigned Public Law No. 103-173 and signed as Public Law 103-322 by President Bill Clinton on September 2, 1993. This law makes it a federal crime to remove a child from the United States or retain a child outside the United States with the intent to obstruct a parent's custodial rights, or to attempt to do so (See 18 U.S.C. § 1204.)  This crime is punishable by up to three years in prison. The law provides an affirmative defense where the abducting parent acted pursuant to a valid court order obtained under the Uniform Child Custody Jurisdiction And Enforcement Act, or where the abducting parent was fleeing domestic violence, or where the failure to return the child resulted from circumstances beyond the taking parent's control and the taking parent made reasonable efforts to notify the left behind parent within 24 hours and returned the child as soon as possible.  Since its enactment, the law has only been used in a very small minority of international child abduction cases prompting parents of internationally abducted children to claim an abuse of or prosecutorial discretion on the part of federal prosecutors.

Enforcement

In 1999 it was reported that, in five years just 62 indictments and 13 convictions resulted from thousands of international child abduction cases of abductions.  The Justice Department said it rarely pursues prosecutions under the IPKCA, because its prosecutors assume a U.S. indictment will prevent children from being returned.  Speaking to a group of concerned parents at a 1999 Congressional hearing on international child abduction, Senator Strom Thurmond of South Carolina, who was the chairman of the Senate Judiciary subcommittee on Criminal Justice Oversight, said, "The law is rarely used.  The [Clinton] administration discouraged the Congress from passing this statute, which is evident from the department's reluctance to enforce it,"

Signing statement
In his signing statement Clinton remarked:

Case law

IPKCA has been subject to various challenges on the basis of the law's very constitutionality to criminalize international conduct and on the interpretation of the law in the context of existing US law.

Constitutionality

U.S. v. Cummings, C.A.9 (Wash.) 2002, 281 F.3d 1046, certiorari denied 123 S.Ct. 179, 537 U.S. 895, 154 L.Ed.2d 162. Commerce 82.6

U.S. v. Alahmad, C.A.10 (Colo.) 2000, 211 F.3d 538, certiorari denied 121 S.Ct. 782, 531 U.S. 1080, 148 L.Ed.2d 679. Constitutional Law 3781

U.S. v. Amer, C.A.2 (N.Y.) 1997, 110 F.3d 873, certiorari denied 118 S.Ct. 258, 522 U.S. 904, 139 L.Ed.2d 185. Constitutional Law 1414

U.S. v. Shahani-Jahromi, E.D.Va.2003, 286 F.Supp.2d 723. Commerce 82.6

U.S. v. Fazal, D.Mass.2002, 203 F.Supp.2d 33.

Parental rights

U.S. v. Shahani-Jahromi, E.D.Va.2003, 286 F.Supp.2d 723. Constitutional Law 4509(16)

U.S. v. Alahmad, D.Colo.1998, 28 F.Supp.2d 1273.

U.S. v. Al-Ahmad, D.Colo.1998, 996 F.Supp. 1055.

Weight and sufficiency of evidence

U.S. v. Al-Ahmad, D.Colo.1998, 996 F.Supp. 1055.

U.S. v. Dallah, C.A.10 (Okla.) 2006, 192 Fed.Appx. 725, 2006 WL 2294848, Unreported.

Sentence

U.S. v. Dallah, C.A.10 (Okla.) 2006, 192 Fed.Appx. 725, 2006 WL 2294848, Unreported.

See also
International child abduction
Hague Abduction Convention
 United States Hague Abduction Convention Compliance Reports
International child abduction in Mexico
Unlawful Flight to Avoid Prosecution
Uniform Child Abduction Prevention Act
Uniform Child Custody Jurisdiction And Enforcement Act

References

External links
Justice Ignores Stolen Kids By Timothy W. Maier
Signing Statement
statute
Wanted by the FBI Parental Kidnapping page

1993 in American law
United States federal criminal legislation
Presidency of Bill Clinton
Kidnapping in the United States